Shannon James (born December 28, 1983) is a former gridiron football linebacker who last played for Hamilton Tiger-Cats of the Canadian Football League. He was signed by the Baltimore Ravens as an undrafted free agent in 2006. He played college football at the University of Massachusetts Amherst. James also played for the Calgary Stampeders.

External links
Calgary Stampeders bio
Just Sports Stats

1983 births
Living people
Sportspeople from Bridgeport, Connecticut
Players of American football from Connecticut
Canadian football linebackers
American football linebackers
American players of Canadian football
UMass Minutemen football players
Baltimore Ravens players
Calgary Stampeders players
Hamilton Tiger-Cats players